Patrick Wolf (born 4 May 1981, in Graz) is an Austrian footballer currently playing for SV Allerheiligen.

Club career 
In 2014, Wolf ended his professional football career and moved to third tier  Regionalliga Mitte side SV Allerheiligen.

International career 
Wolf made his first appearance for the Austria national football team in a friendly against Denmark on 3 March 2010. Austria won the match 2–1.

References

External links 
 Guardian Football

1981 births
Living people
Austrian footballers
Austria international footballers
Austrian Football Bundesliga players
FC Kärnten players
SK Austria Kärnten players
SK Sturm Graz players
Kapfenberger SV players
FC Gratkorn players
SV Ried players
SC Wiener Neustadt players

Association football midfielders
Austrian Regionalliga players